Eduardo Javier Sayun Pallares (born August 6, 1992), known as Eduardo Sayun, is a Mexican association football (soccer) player who currently plays for Reynosa F.C.

External links
 

Atlético Reynosa footballers
1992 births
Living people
Liga MX players
Mexican footballers
Association football midfielders